The TAI T929 ATAK 2 is a twin-engine, heavy attack helicopter under development by Turkish Aerospace Industries. The helicopter is designed for attack, electronic warfare and reconnaissance missions in all-weather environments in both day and night conditions.

The Atak 2 will incorporate some sub-systems and components developed under T129 and the T625 Gökbey helicopter projects.

Development 
In November 2018, the Turkish Undersecretariat for Defense Industries (SSB) initiated the heavy-class Atak 2 helicopter comparable to Boeing AH-64 Apache for Turkish military and potential export markets. In February 2020, the Turkish Undersecretariat for Defense Industries (SSB) signed a contract with Turkish Aerospace Industries to develop the helicopter for an undisclosed value.

The Turkish Aerospace Industries (TAI) is developing the T929 Atak 2 helicopter using industrial experience gained through the joint T129 Attack helicopter project between Turkish Aerospace Industries and the Italian Leonardo Company.

It is being developed to meet a need for a heavy attack helicopter for the Turkish Land Forces and a requirement from the Turkish Navy to operate from the TCG Anadolu amphibious assault ship (LHD).

Design 
The T929 helicopter features tandem seats, asymmetrical weapons bay, high ammunition capacity, low infrared (IR) signature, digital cockpit, ballistic protection, improved avionics, electronic warfare and countermeasure capability.

The helicopter will be fitted with a nose-mounted forward-looking infrared (FLIR) turret that includes target-tracking functionality. The helicopter will also feature electronic warfare systems such as infrared/ultraviolet missile-warning sensors and a tail-mounted directed-infrared countermeasure (DIRCM) system to jam heat-seeking missiles.

The heavy class helicopter can be tasked with air-to-ground combat, air-to-air combat, armed reconnaissance surveillance and close air support (CAS) operations.

Engines 
The T929 Atak 2 will be powered by two 2,500 horsepower turboshaft engines. Turkish TAI has signed an agreement with Ukraine's Motor Sich to supply fourteen TV3-117 engines for its developmental ATAK 2 heavy attack helicopter.

Specifications 

Data from:

See also 
 TAI/AgustaWestland T129 ATAK
 Leonardo Helicopters AW249
 TAI T625 Gökbey
 TAI T629

References

External links 
 TAI T-929 ATAK-2 Official Website

Turkish Aerospace Industries aircraft
Attack helicopters
Proposed aircraft of Turkey